The National Archival Services of Norway is a Norwegian government agency that is responsible for keeping state archives, conducts control of public archiving and works to preserve private archives. It is subordinate to the Ministry of Culture and Church Affairs and consists of the National Archive, eight regional state archives and The Sámi Archives. The oldest complete document is from 1189. It is a letter (a so-called diploma) issued on 28 January 1189 by Pope Clement III (1187-1191) to all clergymen in Norway.

The National Archive is located at Sognsvann in Oslo and preserves all central government papers from when they become 25 years old, as well as some archives from private individuals, companies and organizations. The National Archive is also responsible for control. The state archives are responsible for local and regional government and state agencies, as well as archives from private people, companies, institutions and organizations. The local archives are located in Bergen, Hamar, Kongsberg, Kristiansand, Oslo, Stavanger, Tromsø and Trondheim.

The Digital Archive is a web site that publishes selected works. This includes census data from 1801, 1865, 1875, 1900 and 1910, a database of emigrants and scanned church, probate and court records. The agency publishes three magazines:  Arkivmagasinet, Nytt fra Statsarkivet i Oslo and Bergensposten. The agency is regulated by the Archive Act of 1992. The archives are open to anyone, but there are restrictions on certain types of documents that may contain sensitive or personal information, or could pose a threat to national security. These documents are released to the public between 60 and 100 years after the date of publishing.

See also 
 List of national archives

References

 
Government agencies of Norway
Government agencies established in 1817
Organisations based in Oslo
Archives in Norway
State archives
Norway
1817 establishments in Norway